The 2008 Sylvania 300 was the twenty-seventh race of the 2008 NASCAR Sprint Cup season and the first race of the Chase for the Sprint Cup.

Summary
The 300-lap,  race was held on September 14 at the  New Hampshire Motor Speedway in Loudon, New Hampshire. ABC televised the race beginning at 1 pm US EDT with radio coverage by Performance Racing Network along with Sirius Satellite Radio starting at that same time. This was PRN's first race to be broadcast from NHMS as Motor Racing Network handled the June event following an agreement settled in May, almost one year following the purchase of the facility by Speedway Motorsports, Inc.

Pre-race news
Joey Logano would race after the previous week's cancellation of qualifying at Richmond due to the remains of Hanna to try to qualify for this week's race.

Qualifying
After a 90-minute practice session, rain hit Loudon and washed out qualifying, so the field was lined up according to the rulebook.

Race Recap
Kyle Busch, who came into the race as the top seed in the chase, suffered major mechanical problems as his sway bar was broken. Matt Kenseth was involved in a major crash and, when all was settled, Greg Biffle won and jumped to third place in the Chase standings.

Failed to make race as qualifying was canceled due to rain: Tony Raines (#34) and Carl Long (#46).

References

Sylvania 300
Sylvania 300
NASCAR races at New Hampshire Motor Speedway